Support Force Glacier is a major glacier in the Pensacola Mountains, draining northward between the Forrestal Range and Argentina Range to the Filchner-Ronne Ice Shelf. Mapped by the United States Geological Survey from surveys and US Navy air photos, 1956–66. Named by US-ACAN for the U.S. Naval Support Force Antarctica, which provided logistical support for the United States Antarctic Program during this period.

See also
 Ice stream
 List of glaciers in the Antarctic
 List of Antarctic ice streams

References

Ice streams of Queen Elizabeth Land
Filchner-Ronne Ice Shelf